Acromantis lilii is a species of praying mantis native to Java and the Philippines.

See also
List of mantis genera and species

References

Lilii
Mantodea of Southeast Asia
Insects of Indonesia
Insects of the Philippines
Fauna of Java
Insects described in 1922